Julio César Herrera Navas (born 28 November 1980) is a Venezuelan road cyclist.

Major results

2008
 1st Stage 7b Vuelta a Cuba
2009
 5th Clasico Corre Por La Vida
2011
 4th Copa Federacion Venezolana De Ciclismo Corre Por La Vida

References

External links
 

1980 births
Living people
Venezuelan male cyclists
Place of birth missing (living people)